Dadu Dayal Ji (1544—1603) was a poet-sant from Gujarat, India, a religious reformer who spoke against formalism and priestcraft.

Etymology
"Dadu" means brother, and "Dayal" means "the compassionate one".

Early life
Dadu was born in 1544 in Ahmedabad city of Gujarat state of India.

Teachings and legacy
Dadu Dayal was a spiritual man. His work is known as Dadudayal ki Vani / Dadudayal -Ra Duha. He believed in God because At the age of seven Kabir met him. After meeting with him, he uttered this speech:- Jin moku nij naam diya, soi Satguru hamaar | Dadu doosra koi nahin, Kabir Sirjanhaar |  His many compositions were to establish harmony between Hinduism and Islam.

Dadupanth

Dadu Dayal later moved to Naraina, near Jaipur  Rajasthan, where he gathered around himself a group of followers, forming a sect that became known as the Dadupanth.

Dadupanthis are one of the 7 martial akharas of Vaishnavite sampradaya of Hindus. Vaishnavism has following four major sects: 
 Sri founded by Ramananda, Dadupanthis are one of those 7 martial akharas of Vaishnavite in the sec of Ramanada
 Brahma founded by Madhava 
 Ridra founded by Vishnusuvamin
 Sanakadi founded by Nimbarka.

Followers of Vaishnavism are also called Bairagi or Vairagi. Among the Bairagi, those who became part of the military akharas were organised in the 7 akharas founding dates of most of which are unclear. Each of the akhara accepted members from all 4 sects of vaishnavism. Bairagi military akharas generally did not follow the prohibition against eating meat or taking of narcotics.

Dadu Anubhav Vani

Dadu's compositions in Braj language were recorded by his disciple Rajjab and are known as the Dadu Anubhav Vani, a compilation of 5,000 verses. Another disciple, Janagopal, wrote the earliest biography of Dadu. Dadu alludes to spontaneous (sahaja) bliss in his songs. Much of the imagery used is similar to that used by Kabir, and to that used by earlier Sahajiya Buddhists and Nath yogis. Dadu believed that devotion to God should transcend religious or sectarian affiliation, and that devotees should become non-sectarian or "Nipakh". He has something to say about that:

Dadupanthi Thambas 

Dadu had 100 disciples that attained samadhi. He instructed additional 52 disciples to set up ashrams, 'Thambas' around the region to spread the Lord's word.

Dadu ji spent the latter years of his life in Naraiana, a small distance away from the town of Dudu, near Jaipur city.

Five thambas are considered sacred by the followers; Naraiana, Bhairanaji, Sambhar, Amer, and Karadala (Kalyanpura). Followers at these thambas later set up other places of worship.

Dadupanthi Martial Akharas 

Armed martial akharas were first likely formed by the Dadupanthi Guru Jait Sahib (1693 - 1734 CE) when he recruited armed Naga sadhus. In 1733, Dadupanthis were tax paying farmers in Jaipur State and martial Naga Sadhus were employed to enforce the payment of taxes. In 1793, Dadupanthis and Jaipur State had an agreement under which Dadhupanthis provided 5000 armed soldier sadhus to defend the Jaipur State. During the 1857 rebellion, Dadupanthis acted as mercenaries who helped British raj.

Prominent Dadupanthis

Present status 
Dadupanth has continued in Rajasthan to the present-day and has been a major source of early manuscripts containing songs by Dadu and other North Indian saints.

See also

 Akhara
 Bhakti movement 
 Sampradaya
 Vaishnavism sampradaya
 Shaivism sampradaya
 Dashanami Sampradaya, a sub-sampradaya of Shaivism

References

Sources
 
 
 
 
 Sant Dadu Dayal: Encyclopaedia of Saints Series (Volume 25). Eds.  Bakshi, S. R.; Mittra, Sangh (2002). New Delhi: Criterion Publications.

External links
Short Notes on Dadu dayal ji
Dadu Dayal at Kavita Kosh  (Hindi)
The Biography of Dadu Dayal 
 Video of the celebration of Dadupanth in Naraina

Founders of religions
16th-century Hindu religious leaders
16th-century Indian philosophers
Sant Mat gurus
Bhakti movement
Indian male poets
16th-century Indian poets
Poets from Gujarat
Mystic poets
Religious pluralism
Scholars from Gujarat
People from Jaipur district
1544 births
1603 deaths